Westmoreland is a stop on the Luas light-rail tram system in Dublin, Ireland. It opened in 2017 as a stop on Luas Cross City, an extension of the Green Line through the city centre from St Stephen's Green to Broombridge. It is located on Westmoreland Street, immediately to the south of O'Connell Bridge. It is part of a one-way system and serves trams travelling north. The nearest southbound stop is Trinity. To the south of the stop, the two tracks reunite and trams head around College Green on their way to Sandyford or Brides Glen.

References

Luas Green Line stops in Dublin (city)
Railway stations opened in 2017
2017 establishments in Ireland
Railway stations in the Republic of Ireland opened in the 21st century